The Uhl anomaly is a partial or total loss of the myocardial muscle in the right ventricle. A congenital heart disease, it is very rare: fewer than 100 cases in 1900–1993.

It was first described in 1952 by Dr. Henry Uhl (1921–2009) upon examining one of his patients. 

Three findings are enlarged right ventricular cavity without apical trabeculation with a thin hypokinetic ventricular wall.

References

Further reading

External links 

Congenital heart defects
Rare diseases